Robert Fanshawe may refer to:

Robert Fanshawe (Royal Navy officer) (1740–1823), naval commander and Member of Parliament for Plymouth (UK Parliament constituency)
Robert Fanshawe (British Army officer) (1863–1946), divisional commander in the First World War